Pär Johan Åke Hansson (born 22 June 1986) is a Swedish former professional footballer who played as a goalkeeper. He represented Helsingborgs IF, Ängelholms FF, and Feyenoord during a professional career that spanned between 2005 and 2019. A full international between 2011 and 2014, he won six caps for the Sweden national team and was a squad member at UEFA Euro 2012.

Club career 
Hansson represented Helsingborgs IF, Ängelholms FF, and Feyenoord between 2005 and 2019. A neck injury forced him to announce his retirement from professional football in 2019.

International career 
Hansson represented the Sweden U17, U19, and U21 teams and was a part of the Sweden U21 squad that reached the semi-finals of the 2009 UEFA European Under-21 Championship on home soil in Sweden.

He made his full international debut for Sweden on 19 January 2011 in a friendly 2–1 win against Botswana. He was selected for Sweden's UEFA Euro 2012 squad, and served as a backup goalkeeper for Andreas Isaksson together with Johan Wiland during the tournament. He made his first and only competitive game for Sweden in a 2014 FIFA World Cup qualifier against Faroe Islands on 11 June 2013, covering for Andreas Isaksson in a 2–0 win at Friends Arena. He made his sixth and final international appearance on 17 January 2014 against Moldova, playing for 90 minutes in a friendly 2–1 win.

Career statistics

International

Honours
Helsingborgs IF
Allsvenskan: 2011
Svenska Cupen: 2010, 2011
Svenska Supercupen: 2011, 2012

Feyenoord
 Eredivisie : 2016–17
KNVB Cup: 2015–16
Sweden
King's Cup: 2013

References

External links

1986 births
Living people
Swedish footballers
Sweden international footballers
Sweden youth international footballers
Sweden under-21 international footballers
Footballers from Skåne County
Helsingborgs IF players
Ängelholms FF players
Feyenoord players
Allsvenskan players
Eredivisie players
Association football goalkeepers
UEFA Euro 2012 players